Libby Ludlow (born in Bellevue, Washington on August 26, 1981) is an American former alpine skier who competed in the 2006 Winter Olympics. She retired in 2008 with plans to become a yoga instructor. She went on to teach yoga and has also done Olympics analysis for King5

References

External links
 sports-reference.com
 Libby Ludlow's website

1981 births
Living people
American female alpine skiers
Olympic alpine skiers of the United States
Alpine skiers at the 2006 Winter Olympics
Sportspeople from Bellevue, Washington
American yoga teachers
21st-century American women